Ternovka is a rural locality (a selo) in Starokalitvenskoye Rural Settlement, Rossoshansky District, Voronezh Oblast, Russia. The population was 557 as of 2010. There are 20 streets.

Geography 
Ternovka is located 23 km southeast of Rossosh (the district's administrative centre) by road. Loshchina is the nearest rural locality.

References 

Rural localities in Rossoshansky District